Elections to Arun District Council were held on Thursday 5 May 2011 to elect members to the council.

The incumbent Conservative administration won an 11th election in a row, capitalising on a poor national performance by the Liberal Democrats by gaining five of their seats - Bognor Reigs Hotham, Bognor Reigs Orchard, Littlehampton Beach, Littlehampton River and Wick with Toddington, as well as gaining one previously held by an independent member in Bersted. The Conservatives also gained one seat, Littlehampton River, from Labour, but this was offset by Labour gaining Bognor Regis Pevensey from the Conservatives.

Election result

|}

Ward results

References
Arun District Council - Notice of Election and Statements of Persons Nominated

2011 English local elections
2011
2010s in West Sussex